Amir Tavakkolian (born 7 September 1971 in Mashhad) is an Iranian wrestler.

References
 Profile at UWW Wrestling Database

1971 births
Wrestlers at the 2000 Summer Olympics
Iranian male sport wrestlers
Living people
Sportspeople from Mashhad
Asian Games gold medalists for Iran
Asian Games medalists in wrestling
Wrestlers at the 1998 Asian Games
World Wrestling Championships medalists
Medalists at the 1998 Asian Games
Olympic wrestlers of Iran
Asian Wrestling Championships medalists
20th-century Iranian people
21st-century Iranian people